General Sir Henry Fane Grant  (13 December 1848 – 22 April 1919) was a British Army officer who commanded 5th Division.

Military career
Born the son of General Sir Patrick Grant, Grant was commissioned into the 4th Queen's Own Hussars in 1868 and took part in the Nile Expedition in 1884. He became Assistant Adjutant-General in Bengal in 1891, Inspector-General of Cavalry in India in 1893 and Inspector of Cavalry in the United Kingdom in 1898. He went on to be General Officer Commanding 5th Division in 1903 and Governor of Malta in 1907 before he retired in 1909.

In retirement he became Lieutenant of the Tower of London. He was killed while out rabbit-shooting in Scotland and is commemorated by a memorial tablet at Duthil Church near Carrbridge.

References

|-

1848 births
1919 deaths
British Army generals
Knights Grand Cross of the Order of the Bath
Knights Grand Cross of the Royal Victorian Order
4th Queen's Own Hussars officers
Governors and Governors-General of Malta